The EFAF Cup was an international competition  for European American Football clubs. It was the second highest level of club competition in the European Federation of American Football (EFAF), behind the European Football League (EFL),.

EFAF Cup 
Organised by EFAF, this competition was comparable to football's Europa League. American Football teams from the strongest leagues in Europe competed annually to achieve results good enough to qualify them for the EFAF Cup competition.

The format dated from 2002 and offers top-division European clubs who have not qualified for the highest level of competition (EFL) a chance to play internationally.

Participants were Champions and Vice-Champions of the "smaller" American Football nations, and those finishing just behind EFL qualification places in the "bigger" American Football leagues.

The competition was folded after the 2013 edition. The reason was, in 2014 the Big6 European Football League was established as the new top tier competition. So in fact, the EFL took the place of the EFAF Cup.

Competition format 
In the group phase, four groups consist each of three teams. Each team plays each other once and has a home game and an away game. The winners of these groups qualify directly for the semi-final phase.

Should more teams qualify for and enter the EFAF Cup competition, more groups are created and a quarter-final phase introduced.

Players 

Participating teams must submit a roster of at most 60 players to EFAF by March 31 of the competition year. These players, and no others, are permitted to play for the club within the competition that year. No changes can be made to the list.

On each game day, the roster must be reduced to 45 players who will actually participate in the game. This number must include no more than 3 "American" players. In EFAF rules an "American" is defined as a player with an American, Canadian, Mexican, or Japanese passport. There is no restriction on how many of these 3 can be on the field at the same time.

EFAF Cup Finals

Champions

by team

by country

References

External links 
 EFAF Cup

American football competitions in Europe
Recurring sporting events established in 2002
2002 establishments in Europe
2013 disestablishments in Europe
Recurring sporting events disestablished in 2013